Promise Onye Ogochukwu (born 13 March 2002) is a Nigerian footballer currently playing as a forward for YSCC Yokohama of J3 League.

Career statistics

Club
.

Notes

References

External links

Onye Ogochukwu at YSCC Yokohama

2002 births
Living people
Nigerian footballers
Nigerian expatriate footballers
Association football forwards
J3 League players
YSCC Yokohama players
Nigerian expatriate sportspeople in Japan
Expatriate footballers in Japan